William Smith (fl. 1553–54) was an English politician.

Life
Due to the popularity of his name, Smith has not been identified.

Career
He was a Member (MP) of the Parliament of England for Newport, Cornwall October 1553 and Chippenham in April 1554.

References

Year of birth missing
Year of death missing
Members of the pre-1707 English Parliament for constituencies in Cornwall
English MPs 1553 (Mary I)
English MPs 1554
Clerks of the Privy Council